One City Plaza, formerly called One Bank of America Plaza, is a 17-story skyscraper located at 421 Fayetteville Street in Raleigh, North Carolina with .

History
One Hannover Square and Two Hannover Square were completed in 1985.

Lennar Partners of Miami, Florida bought the building and its 554-space parking garage for $44.8 million in 2000.

One Hannover Plaza changed its name to One Bank of America Plaza in 2005 after Bank of America renewed its lease. Progress Energy had  but was moving into a new building of its own.

In July 2005, The Simpson Organization of Atlanta, Georgia bought the building for $47.1 million. At the time, it had an occupancy rate of 80 percent. When the company listed the property for sale in 2010, it was 95 percent full. Simpson made improvements including a lobby redesign, a new fitness facility, additional conference space, and renovated retail space.

References

External links

Photos

Skyscraper office buildings in Raleigh, North Carolina
Bank buildings in North Carolina
Office buildings completed in 1985